Charles Yate is the name of:
Sir Charles Yate, 1st Baronet (1849–1940), British administrator in India and politician
Charles Allix Lavington Yate (1872–1914), British First World War recipient of the Victoria Cross

See also
Charles Yates (died 1870), brigadier-general during the American Civil War